Clyde Emrich (April 6, 1931 – November 10, 2021) was an American Olympic weightlifter. He was also a long-time strength coach for the Chicago Bears, who in 2008 named their weight room after him. He is a member of the Chicagoland Sports Hall of Fame.

Early life and family
Emrich was born in Chicago, Illinois. When he was a child, he enjoyed playing football and baseball. He began lifting weights at age 15 where he only weighed 110 pounds standing at 5 foot 6 inches tall. He had no coaching or training so he would turn to Strength and Health magazines for help on strength programs and how to lift. His early start to lifting weights paid off, leading him to win his high school wrestling championship and finishing the 100-yard dash in 10.2 seconds. He had five sisters and one brother. His father worked for the Pittsburgh Glass Company as a salesman.

Career
Emrich was self-coached throughout his career in weightlifting. He placed eighth in the 181-pound (82.5 kg) weight class on the U.S. Olympic weightlifting team in the 1952 Summer Olympics in Helsinki, Finland. In 1954, he took 3rd place in the Senior World Championships held in Vienna, Austria. He later won the silver medal in Munich, Germany and was invited to be a part of the American team on its goodwill tour of the Far East. Emrich set his first world record on March 30, 1957. He was the first middle heavyweight at 198 pounds to clean and jerk 400 pounds. Two weeks later, he set the record to 409 pounds on the clean and jerk.

Emrich was also in the United States military. While in the military, he was stationed in Germany. He continued to strength train and competed internationally. In 1957, Emrich severely hurt his shoulder which required 18 months of treatment. In 1959, however, he competed in the Pan American Games in Chicago where he took home a gold medal. During his career, he won four Senior National titles as well as several state and regional championships.

Organizations
USA Weightlifting Hall of Fame
Illinois State Weightlifting Hall of Fame
USA Strength and Conditioning Coaches Hall of Fame
Chicagoland Sports Hall of Fame

References

External links
 Clyde Emrich - Hall of Fame at Weightlifting Exchange
 Bears name weight room after pioneering strength coach

1931 births
2021 deaths
American male weightlifters
Olympic weightlifters of the United States
Weightlifters at the 1952 Summer Olympics
Pan American Games medalists in weightlifting
Pan American Games gold medalists for the United States
Weightlifters at the 1959 Pan American Games
Medalists at the 1959 Pan American Games
Sportspeople from Chicago
Military personnel from Illinois
Chicago Bears coaches
20th-century American people
21st-century American people